The National Rally of Independents, is a political party in Morocco. Despite self-identifying as social-democratic, the party has been described as pro-business and liberal, and the party has a history of cooperating with two other parties with a liberal orientation, the Popular Movement and the Constitutional Union, since 1993. Since September 2021, it has been the country's ruling party.

History and profile
The party was founded in 1978 by Prime Minister Ahmed Osman, brother-in-law of King Hassan II.

The establishment united independent politicians favoured by the palace and used by the administration to counter the parties that were critical of the king and his government. Later, it became an ordinary party without a special role in Morocco's multi-party system. It was succeeded by the Constitutional Union as the palace's favourite party.

In the parliamentary election held on 27 September 2002, the party won 41 out of 325 seats. In the next parliamentary election, held on 7 September 2007, the RNI won 39 out of 325 seats. The RNI was included in the government of Prime Minister Abbas El Fassi, formed on 15 October 2007.

After the 2016 parliamentary election, billionaire businessman Aziz Akhannouch was elected party president. He undertook a major image revamp for the party, establishing party youth, women's, and student wings, and created a large social media presence for the RNI, spending US$211,000 on Facebook and Instagram ads. Akhannouch also launched the "100 Villes, 100 Jours" (100 Cities, 100 Days) party initiative in which RNI officials and supporters travelled to 100 cities in Morocco, particularly medium and small-sized cities, in 100 days to have their citizens insert proposals for their cities.

In the 2021 general election, the RNI placed first, winning 102 seats amid a crushing defeat for the ruling Justice and Development Party. Akhannouch was then designated Prime Minister by Mohammed VI.

Prominent members
Ahmed Osman, founder
Salaheddine Mezouar, government minister (2007–2012) and current Secretary General of the party.
Moncef Belkhayat, government minister (2009–2012)
Amina Benkhadra, government minister (2007–2012)
Yassir Znagui, government minister (2010–2011). Left the party in late 2011 after being nominated by the King to join the Royal Cabinet as an adviser. 
Aziz Akhannouch, government minister currently in office (2007–) and prime minister since 2021. Left the party on 2 January 2012 in order to participate in Abdelilah Benkirane's government as an independent.
Asmaa Rhlalou, Mayor of Rabat (2021–)
Nabila Rmili, Mayor of Casablanca (2021–)

References

1978 establishments in Morocco
Centrist parties in Africa
Classical liberal parties
Liberal parties in Morocco
Monarchist parties
Political parties established in 1978
Political parties in Morocco